Weenusk may refer to:

 Weenusk First Nation, a Cree First Nation band government in Ontario, Canada
 a groundhog
 Weenusk, the name of two Hudson's Bay Company vessels